The 144th Infantry Regiment was an infantry regiment in the Imperial Japanese Army. The regiment was attached to the 55th Division. The regiment participated in the Second Sino-Japanese War and World War II, fighting in the Pacific during a number of battles including those at Guam, Rabaul, and Salamaua. It also participated in the invasion of Buna-Gona, the Kokoda Track campaign and the battle of Buna–Gona.

After being withdrawn to Rabaul, the regiment was transported to Burma to rejoin the 55th Division.

Organization
1st Battalion
2nd Battalion
3rd Battalion

Commanders
Lieutenant Colonel Masao Kusunose (????–1942; suicided in 1946) 
Colonel Yamamoto (1942–1943; killed in action)

References

Sources
 
 

Infantry Regiments (Imperial Japanese Army)

J
Military units and formations established in 1937
Military units and formations disestablished in 1945
Kokoda